The three arrondissements of the Morbihan department are:
 Arrondissement of Lorient, (subprefecture: Lorient) with 58 communes. The population of the arrondissement was 312,063 in 2016. 
 Arrondissement of Pontivy, (subprefecture: Pontivy) with 93 communes. The population of the arrondissement was 155,521 in 2016. 
 Arrondissement of Vannes, (prefecture of the Morbihan department: Vannes) with 99 communes. The population of the arrondissement was 279,964 in 2016.

History

In 1800 the arrondissements of Vannes, Lorient, Ploërmel and Pontivy were established. The arrondissement of Ploërmel was disbanded in 1926.

The borders of the arrondissements of Morbihan were modified in January 2017:
 two communes from the arrondissement of Lorient to the arrondissement of Vannes
 21 communes from the arrondissement of Vannes to the arrondissement of Pontivy

References

Morbihan